The Jones Family in Hollywood is a 1939 American comedy film directed by Malcolm St. Clair and written by Harold Tarshis. The film stars Jed Prouty, Spring Byington, Kenneth Howell, George Ernest, June Carlson and Florence Roberts. It was released on June 2, 1939 by 20th Century Fox.

The film is one of 17 in the Jones Family B-movie series.

Plot

Cast       
Jed Prouty as John Jones
Spring Byington as Mrs. John Jones
Kenneth Howell as Jack Jones
George Ernest as Roger Jones
June Carlson as Lucy Jones
Florence Roberts as Granny Jones
Billy Mahan as Bobby Jones
William Tracy as Danny Regan
June Gale as Alice Morley
Marvin Stephens as Tommy McGuire
Hamilton MacFadden as Director Townsend
Matt McHugh as Charlie
Lillian Yarbo as Maid (uncredited)
 Phyllis Barry as Actress (uncredited)

References

External links 
 

1939 films
1930s English-language films
20th Century Fox films
American comedy films
1939 comedy films
Films directed by Malcolm St. Clair
American black-and-white films
1930s American films